Omid Ebrahimi Zarandini (born 16 September 1987) is an Iranian footballer who plays for Al-Wakrah as a defensive midfielder.

Early years
Omid Ebrahimi was born in Zarandin-e Sofla, a village located in Neka County.

Club career
Omid Ebrahimi was discovered by Amir Ghalenoei in 2011. He started his career in Esteghlal Dargahan. He joined Sepahan in 2010 after spending the previous season at Shahrdari Bandar Abbas in the Azadegan League. Ebrahimi's first competitive appearance came in the Iran Pro League match against Rah Ahan on 27 July 2010, where he played the full 90 minutes.

On 10 June 2014, Ebrahimi signed a two-year contract with Esteghlal. He spent an excellent career in Blues of the Capital and selected as the best midfielder of Persian Gulf Pro League in 2015–16 and 2016–17 seasons and also became the best goalscorer among midfielders in the history of Esteghlal.

International career

He made his debut under Carlos Queiroz on 9 December 2012 in a match against Saudi Arabia in the 2012 WAFF. He was called into Iran's 2015 AFC Asian Cup squad on 30 December 2014 by Carlos Queiroz. In May 2018 he was named in Iran's preliminary squad for the 2018 FIFA World Cup in Russia.

Career statistics

Club

International
Statistics accurate as of match played 10 November 2022.

Honours

Club
Sepahan
 Persian Gulf Pro League: 2010–11, 2011–12
 Hazfi Cup: 2012–13

Esteghlal
 Hazfi Cup: 2017–18

Individual
 Persian Gulf Pro League Team of the Year: 2014–15, 2015–16, 2016–17, 2017–18
 Persian Gulf Pro League Midfielder of the Year: 2015–16, 2016–17, 2017–18
 AFC Asian Cup Team of the Tournament: 2019

References

1987 births
Living people
Shahrdari Bandar Abbas players
Sepahan S.C. footballers
Esteghlal F.C. players
Al Ahli SC (Doha) players
K.A.S. Eupen players
Al-Wakrah SC players
Persian Gulf Pro League players
Qatar Stars League players
Belgian Pro League players
Iranian footballers
Iran international footballers
2015 AFC Asian Cup players
Sportspeople from Mazandaran province
Association football midfielders
2018 FIFA World Cup players
Expatriate footballers in Qatar
Iranian expatriate sportspeople in Qatar
Expatriate footballers in Belgium
Iranian expatriate sportspeople in Belgium
2019 AFC Asian Cup players